Kitsap Lake is a lake in Kitsap County, Washington. The lake is near the exact center of the Kitsap Peninsula, roughly between the Dyes Inlet in the Puget Sound and the Blue Hills peak range. It is located on the edge of the Bremerton, Washington city limits. 

Kitsap Lake is 238 acres in area. It is shallow, reaching only 27 feet deep at its deepest point.

References

Kitsap
Bodies of water of Kitsap County, Washington